Datacoup was a New York-based start up company that provides a marketplace for individuals to sell a feed of their personal data, such as social media activity and credit card transactions, to information brokers for a monthly fee. In November 2019, Datacoup issued an email to users stating that it was shutting down operations and will be decommissioning all of its servers.

History

Creation
CEO and co-founder Matt Hogan founded Datacoup in 2012. Hogan's inspiration for Datacoup sprouted from his interests in new technology, such as mobile and web applications, in addition to his hope of contributing to an efficient marketplace.

Services
Datacoup's beta trial offered clients up to $8 a month in return for access to various online accounts, such as Facebook, LinkedIn, and Google+, in addition to debit and credit card transactions. 
 
After the client has selected which accounts they choose to sell and to whom, Datacoup offers a variety of visual analytics displaying the value of the data. Finally, the Datacoup user is paid monthly for their contribution. The data collected from social media accounts and other online activity is combined with fellow Datacoup users. All identifiable markers are removed, and the data is analyzed in big sets with the goal of detecting trends within specific demographics.

Datacoup generates revenue by charging data brokers, advertisers, and brands for access to various trends. Datacoup caters to both advertising firms and consumers because firms will have access to both social and online activity in addition to spending habits, while consumers simultaneously gain a better understanding, and therefore control, over what happens to their data. This unique relationship between data collectors and the public would ultimately stipulate transparency from other data-tracking enterprises.

As of March 2014, Datacoup was paying approximately 1,500 users during their beta trial period, all of whom were making less than $5.

According to Hogan, online data is becoming more of an asset for three reasons: First, the rise in technology is causing people to spend a significant amount of time online, second, marketing infrastructure enables the crunching of big data sets that yield high percentages of actual sales, and third, the rise in social media enables the collecting of personal data in large quantities.

Challenges
Major challenges Datacoup faces include: advertisers are less likely to pay for trends extracted from a small pool of data, and are more likely to seek free, big data provided by data brokers, second, potential Datacoup clients are hesitant to sell their online activity, (particularly financial information) for $8, and finally, the monetization of personal data poses significant challenges because some data is considered to be far more valuable to advertisers than others.

Background
Gathering information about consumers has been a standard marketing strategy. However, social media and mobile growth has increased the volume of personal data inputted into various databases. Many freemium services, such as Facebook and Twitter, generate revenue by selling personal data to third party firms. Data collected from social media and mobile phone users are highly valuable because they enable effective advertising to targeted audiences.

In 2011 alone, Facebook generated $2.7 billion from targeted advertisement sales.

Closing 

On November 19, 2019, Datacoup announced they will be closing and deleting all data. This is the email sent to users:

Hi there,
Datacoup is shutting down operations and will be decommissioning all of our servers.
Any data you previously added to the platform was never sold. If you received payments in the past, they were coming from the Datacoup treasury account.
The server decommission process will erase any data you previously connected to the platform.
Thanks for your support over the years.
-Datacoup Team

Notes

References 

http://www.datacoup.com

We Are NY Tech. “Matt Hogan” http://wearenytech.com/333-matt-hogan--founder-ceo-datacoup. New York, 7 January 2013. Retrieved on 22 May 2014.

Simonite, Tom. “Sell Your Personal Data For $8 A Month”, ‘’MIT Technology Review’’, 14 February 2014. Retrieved on 22 May 2014.

Tanner, Adam. “Others Take Your Data For Free, This Site Pays Cash”, ‘’Forbes’’, 03 March 2014. Retrieved on 21 May 2014.

Lachutt, Scott. “Matt Hogan: Why a Data Empowered Consumer is a Trusting Consumer”, ‘’psfk Salon, Los Angeles, 11 April 2014. Retrieved on 20 May 2014.

Kroft, Steve. “Data Brokers: Selling Your Personal Information”, ‘’CBS News’’, 09 March 2014. Retrieved on 20 May 2014.

Technewsdaily. “How Facebook Sells Your Personal Information”, ‘’Discovery’’, 24 January 2013. Retrieved on 18 May 2014.

Mass media companies based in New York City
Companies based in New York City
American companies established in 2014
2014 establishments in New York City